Secrets of a Secretary is a 1931 American pre-Code drama film directed by George Abbott, and starring Claudette Colbert and Herbert Marshall. The film was stage actress Mary Boland's first role in a talkie.

Premise
Society girl becomes a social secretary when her father dies penniless. From a story by Charles Brackett.

Cast
Claudette Colbert as Helen Blake
Herbert Marshall as Lord Danforth
Georges Metaxa as Frank D'Agnoll
Betty Lawford as Sylvia Merritt
Mary Boland as Mrs. Merritt
Berton Churchill as Mr. Merritt
Averell Harris as Don Marlow
Betty Garde as Dorothy White
Hugh O'Connell as Charlie Rickenbacker
Joseph Crehan as Reporter (uncredited)
Porter Hall as Drunk (uncredited)
H. Dudley Hawley as Mr. Blake (uncredited)
Olaf Hytten as Court Reporter (uncredited)
Edward Keane as Albany Hotel Manager (uncredited)
Barry Macollum (uncredited)
Millard Mitchell as Policeman (uncredited)
William Pawley (uncredited)
Charles C. Wilson as Police Captain (uncredited)

See also
The House That Shadows Built (1931 promotional film by Paramount Pictures)

References

External links

Still at gettyimages.com

1931 films
American black-and-white films
1931 drama films
Paramount Pictures films
Films directed by George Abbott
American drama films
1930s English-language films
1930s American films